Dutenhofen is the eastmost borough of the city of Wetzlar, Germany. It has approximately 3,100 residents (December 31, 2005).

Geography
The district lies in the Lahntal region just south of the Lahn. Nearby is the Dutenhofener See, a lake featuring a man-made beach, volleyball pit, trampolines, cafe, and bar. East of the district lies the OCULUS GmbH industrial park.

History
Dutenhofen was an independent municipality until January 1, 1976 when it became a suburb of the city of Lahn. On August 1, 1979 Dutenhofen became a borough of Wetzlar.

Sport 
Dutenhofen is the home of the Handball-Club HSG Dutenhofen-Münchholzhausen, from Bundesligist HSG Wetzlar.

Transportation 
Dutenhofen shares busline 11 with the surrounding cities, including Giessen. Directly north of this borough runs the Bundesstraße B49 (Gießen - Wetzlar - Koblenz - Trier). Parallel to the road runs the Deutsche Bahn-line called "Dillstrecke" (Gießen - Wetzlar - Siegen).

References 

Wetzlar